The Lady Confesses is a 1945 American film noir directed by Sam Newfield.

Plot
While on the verge of being divorced, Norma Craig disappears. Seven years later, when her husband, Larry Craig, plans to marry a girl Vicki McGuire, Norma returns and tells Vicki that she nor anybody else can marry Larry. Soon both the girl and her fiancé find themselves mixed up with a crooked nightclub owner, gangsters and murder.

Cast
 Mary Beth Hughes as Vicki McGuire
 Hugh Beaumont as Larry Craig
 Edmund MacDonald as Lucky Brandon
 Claudia Drake as Lucile Compton
 Emmett Vogan as Police Capt. Brown
 Barbara Slater as Norma Craig
 Edward Howard as Detective Harmon
 Dewey Robinson as Steve
 Carol Andrews as Margie

Soundtrack
 "Dance Close To Me, Darling" (Written by Robert Unger and Al Seaman)
 "It's All Your Fault" (Written by Cindy Walker)
 "It's A Fine Old World" (Written by Smith, Kuhstos and Blonder)

References

External links

1945 films
Film noir
American mystery films
1940s English-language films
American black-and-white films
Producers Releasing Corporation films
1945 mystery films
Films directed by Sam Newfield
1940s American films